Lieutenant-General J.O. Michel Maisonneuve, CMM,  is a former Canadian Army officer who has served as the Assistant Deputy Chief of the Defence Staff of Canada and Chief of Staff of NATO’s Allied Command Transformation in Norfolk. He is also the 30th recipient of the Vimy Award.

Education 
Maisonneuve obtained a Bachelor of Arts degree from the Royal Military College of Canada in 1976 and later he graduated with a Masters in Management and Defence Policy from the Royal Military College of Canada.

Military career 
Maisonneuve joined the Canadian Armed Forces (CAF) in 1972 as an armoured officer and after graduating from Royal Military College of Canada, he would be a part of 12e Régiment blindé du Canada out of Valcartier. He would be deployed to the United Nations Peacekeeping Force in Cyprus and later the Bosnian War and Kosovo War. During his time in Kosovo he was assigned to Headquarters of the Organization for Security and Cooperation in Europe (OSCE) as a Brigadier-General from November 1998 to May 1999 where he would later be awarded a Meritorious Service Cross for his service.

He would later serve as Assistant Deputy Chief of the Defence Staff of Canada and Chief of Staff of NATO’s Allied Command Transformation in Norfolk.

In 2007 he would retire from the CAF and became the Academic Director at the Royal Military College Saint-Jean.

Honours and decorations 
National Awards/Decorations

 
 Commander of the Order of Military Merit
 Meritorious Service Cross
 Canadian Forces' Decoration
 
 Officer of the Legion of Honour
 
 Officer of the U.S. Legion of Merit

Other Awards

 30th recipient of the Vimy Award

Controversy 

On November 9th 2022, Maisonneuve delivered an acceptance speech for the Vimy Award at a gala hosted by the Conference of Defence Associations Institute. The speech was broadly critical of many progressive aspects of society and the direction of Canada's military. In subsequent reporting, Youri Cormier, executive director of the Conference of Defence Associations and CDA Institute noted that “many attendees were offended by LGen (ret’d) Maisonneuve’s speech. His remarks do not reflect those of the CDA Institute.” The speech was also publicly criticized by the Minister of National Defence, Anita Anand, and the Canadian Armed Forces' Chief, Professional Conduct and Culture (CPCC). It should be noted, however, that the speech received a standing ovation from the serving senior Canadian military officers.

Legacy 

 The Maisonneuve Bursaries and Shield Award at the Royal Military College Saint-Jean is named in his honour and is awarded to the two 1st year Officer Cadets with the highest academic averages in Social Sciences and Sciences

References 

Living people

Year of birth missing (living people)

Place of birth missing (living people)
Royal Military College of Canada alumni
Academic staff of the Royal Military College of Canada